Ross Anthony "Rossi" Jarvis (born 11 March 1988) is an English footballer who plays for  side Leiston, where he plays as a defender.

Club career

Norwich City
Jarvis began his career as a trainee with Norwich City, making history as the youngest player to appear in their reserve side when aged only 14. The younger brother of fellow Norwich academy product Ryan Jarvis, he progressed to become a trainee with the Canaries and made his senior debut as a second-half substitute for Dean Marney in a 2–1 League Cup defeat away to Birmingham City on 26 October 2005. His league debut came on 5 November 2005, as a substitute in a 2–0 defeat away to Wolverhampton Wanderers. He made one further appearance in the league as a substitute, away to Millwall, before signing a professional contract in January 2006.

The two Jarvis brothers played together for Norwich on only one occasion – a League Cup tie against Rotherham United on 19 September 2006. That proved to be Jarvis' only appearance for Norwich in the 2006–07 season, as he was loaned out to League Two side Torquay on 25 January 2007. He played four times for the Gulls before a back injury ended his loan spell. After recovering, Jarvis played out the remainder of the season on loan at League One Rotherham United, making ten appearances.

It would be almost a year on from the League Cup game at Rotherham until Jarvis next played a competitive game for Norwich. With suspensions to Dion Dublin, Jason Shackell, and Julien Brellier, Jarvis started in a League Cup Third Round tie on 25 September 2007 away to then Premier League high-flyers Manchester City, along with fellow academy graduate Michael Spillane. Both players performances drew high praise from the media, as Norwich lost the game 1–0. Jarvis started his first ever league game for Norwich against Sheffield Wednesday four days later, and went on to start in three further games. However, he failed to feature under new Canaries manager Glenn Roeder, who was appointed on 30 October 2007, and was released by the club in May 2008.

Luton Town
Jarvis signed for League Two side Luton Town, who had been hit with a 30-point deduction, on 7 August 2008. He found some familiar faces in the dressing room, as the Hatters squad included ex-Norwich teammates Michael Spillane, Chris Martin and Paul McVeigh. Jarvis played a total of 46 games for Luton in 2008–09, including in every round of the club's Football League Trophy success, scoring the winning goal in the quarter-final against Walsall. He is known for his accurate set piece delivery, using this to contribute to ten assists in the 2008–09 season.

Though he was a regular player under Luton manager Mick Harford, his dismissal in October 2009, and subsequent replacement in Richard Money, saw Jarvis used sparsely. On 7 May 2010, he was released from his contract at Luton, having made 71 appearances for the club.

Barnet
In June 2010, Jarvis joined Barnet. He made his debut for the Bees on the opening day of the 2010–11 season away to Chesterfield and was replaced in the 54th minute by fellow debutant, Ricky Holmes. He left Barnet at the end of the 2010–11 season, having made 22 league appearances.

Cambridge United
Jarvis signed a one-month contract with Conference National side Cambridge United in August 2011 after impressing during a trial. This was then extended to a one-year contract on 31 August 2011. The midfielder signed a new one-year contract with The U's on 8 May 2012 after making 39 starts in his first season at the club.

Lowestoft Town & Dereham Town
After a brief spell in Australia with Oakleigh Cannons, Jarvis joined Lowestoft Town in 2013. After 159 league appearances, he joined Dereham Town in April 2018 before re-joining the Trawler Boys for the 2018–19 season.Rossi Jarvis and Kieran Higgs sign for Lowestoft Town Jarvis left Lowestoft Town again in May 2021 and re-joined Dereham Town at the end of the month. Jarvis made 26 appearances and scored two goals in the Isthmian League North Division and played once in the FA Cup.

Leiston
On 13 June 2022, Jarvis signed for Southern League Premier Division Central side Leiston, joining his brother Ryan, who signed for the club the previous week.

International career
Whilst in non-League football with Luton, Jarvis was eligible to be called into the England C squad for friendlies against both Hungary under-23's and Poland under-23's in September and November 2009. He played in both, including captaining the side to a 2–1 victory in Poland.

Personal life
His older brother Ryan Jarvis and his cousin Adam Tann have also played professional football.

HonoursLuton Town'
Football League Trophy: 2008–09

References

External links

1988 births
Living people
People from Fakenham
English footballers
Association football midfielders
Norwich City F.C. players
Torquay United F.C. players
Rotherham United F.C. players
Luton Town F.C. players
Barnet F.C. players
Cambridge United F.C. players
Oakleigh Cannons FC players
Lowestoft Town F.C. players
Dereham Town F.C. players
Leiston F.C. players
English Football League players
National League (English football) players
Isthmian League players
Southern Football League players
England youth international footballers
England semi-pro international footballers
English expatriate footballers
English expatriate sportspeople in Australia
Expatriate soccer players in Australia